Swimming to Catalina is the fourth novel in the Stone Barrington series by Stuart Woods.

It was first published in 1998 by HarperCollins. The novel takes place in Los Angeles, after the events in Dead in the Water. The novel continues the story of Stone Barrington, a retired detective turned lawyer/private investigator.

External links
Stuart Woods website

1998 American novels
American thriller novels
Novels set in Los Angeles
HarperCollins books